Mansouri   is a village  in the  Tyre District in South Lebanon.

History
In  the 1596 tax records in the early Ottoman era, it was named as a village,  Mansura, in the  nahiya (subdistrict) of   Tibnin   under the liwa' (district) of Safad. It had a population of  33 households, all Muslim. The villagers paid a fixed tax-rate of 25% on various agricultural products, including 1,300 akçe on wheat, 350 on barley; 150 on olive trees, 100 on "occasional revenues"; a total of 1,900  akçe.

In 1875 Victor Guérin noted here about  "a dozen houses built with ancient materials, quite regularly carved. A oualy was dedicated to Neby Mansour. Cisterns dug into the rock and several broken sarcophagi also prove that this hamlet, now inhabited by some poor Métualis families, has succeeded a much larger former village."

The PEF's Survey of Western Palestine described the village: "A village built of stone, on the plain, surrounded by olives, figs, and arable land ; contains about 50 Moslems. Water from cisterns and spring near shore." They also noted some rock-cut tombs by the village.

On 13 April 1996, during Operation Grapes of Wrath, an Israel Defense Forces helicopter attacked a vehicle in Mansouri, killing two women and four children.

References

Bibliography

External links
Municipality website
Mansouri, localiban.org
Survey of Western Palestine, Map 1: IAA, Wikimedia commons

Populated places in the Israeli security zone 1985–2000
Populated places in Tyre District
Shia Muslim communities in Lebanon